Eduardo Fiestas Arce (16 June 1925 – 9 July 1987) was a Peruvian basketball player. He competed in the men's tournament at the 1948 Summer Olympics. His brother, Manuel, is also a basketball player who played during the 1936 Olympics.

Fiestas died in Lima on 9 July 1987, at the age of 62.

References

External links
 

1925 births
1987 deaths
Peruvian men's basketball players
1954 FIBA World Championship players
Olympic basketball players of Peru
Basketball players at the 1948 Summer Olympics
People from Lambayeque Region
1950 FIBA World Championship players
20th-century Peruvian people